August Musarurwa (usually identified as August Msarurgwa on record labels) was the Zimbabwean composer of the 1950s hit tune  "Skokiaan" (also known as Skokiyana, Skokian).

History
August Musarurwa was born and raised in the Zvimba (map) district of Mashonaland, a region in the north of what was then Southern Rhodesia. He attended Marshall Hartley Primary School before moving to what was then Salisbury (Harare) to find work. After working as a clerk for a tobacco company, he joined the British South African Police as a 22-year-old. The BSAP employed Musarurwa as an interpreter, but later he transferred to the police band.

He left the BSAP to work for the Bulawayo Cold Storage Commission, living in the company's compound. As leader of the African Dance Band of the Cold Storage Commission of Southern Rhodesia, Musarurwa recorded Skokiaan as an instrumental in 1947. A second version of the tune was released in the United States by London Records in 1954 under the name of the Bulawayo Sweet Rhythms Band, as Musarurwa's band was now called.

Louis Armstrong met Musarurwa in November 1960 during his African tour. According to his daughter, Armstrong gave Musarurwa a jacket and invited him to visit the United States. The visit was cancelled due to the death in 1962 of Tandiwe, Musarurwa's spouse.

Death
August Musarurwa died in 1968 and is buried in his family cemetery in his village near Zvimba. The inscription on his grave reads Here lies August Machona Musarurwa, great singer and music composer, renowned the world over.

See also
 Skokiaan

References 

Zimbabwean musicians
British South Africa Police officers
Rhodesian musicians
Rhodesian composers
1968 deaths
Year of birth missing